Aphonogelia is a rare neuropsychological condition with which a person cannot laugh audibly.

References

Neuropsychology
Laughter